Turman may refer to:

People
Buddy Turman (1933–2007), American professional heavyweight boxer
George Turman (1928–2008), former Lieutenant Governor of Montana
Glynn Turman (born 1947), American stage, television, film actor and writer, director, and producer
Jimmy Turman (1927–2019), American politician
Lawrence Turman (born 1926), film producer, director of The Peter Stark Producing Program at the University of Southern California

Places
Turman, Iran, village in South Khorasan
Turman Township, Sullivan County, Indiana, USA